
Year 540 (DXL) was a leap year starting on Sunday of the Julian calendar. In the Roman Empire, it was known as the Year of the Consulship of Iustinus without colleague (or, less frequently, year 1293 Ab urbe condita). The denomination 540 for this year has been used since the early medieval period, when the Anno Domini calendar era became the prevalent method in Europe for naming years.

Events 
 By place 

 Byzantine Empire 
 Emperor Justinian I offers to make peace with Vitiges, but Belisarius refuses to transmit the message. The Ostrogoths then offer to support Belisarius as emperor of the West.
 May – Gothic War: Belisarius conquers Mediolanum (modern Milan) and the Gothic capital Ravenna. Vitiges and his wife Matasuntha are taken as captives to Constantinople. 
 Belisarius consolidates Italy and begins mopping-up operations, capturing the Gothic fortifications. The cities Ticinum and Verona north of River Po remain in Gothic hands. 
 Ildibad succeeds Vitiges as king of the Ostrogoths, and installs his nephew Totila as commander of the Gothic army. He recaptures Venetia and Liguria in Northern Italy.

 Europe 
 In Britain various kingdoms are united by a ruler (High King) or overlord, while wars are fought between others.
 King Custennin ap Cado is deposed, and returns to Dumnonia in the south-west of Great Britain.

 Persia 
 King Khosrau I, jealous of Justinian's victories in the West, receives an embassy from the Ostrogoths at Ctesiphon, urging him to act before the Byzantines become too powerful.
 Khosrau I breaks the Eternal Peace after eight years. The Persian army marches up the River Euphrates, and follows a path to extract tributes from towns along the way to Antioch.
 Khosrau I captures Antioch after a fierce siege; he systematically plunders the city to the extent that marble statues and mosaics are transported to Persia.

 Africa 

 Solomon captures the Aurès Mountains from the Moors and extends Byzantine authority over Numidia and Mauretania Sitifensis. The city of Theveste (Algeria) is restored and fortified.

 Asia 
 Jinheung becomes king of the Korean kingdom of Silla.

 By topic 

 Religion 
 Cassiodorus, former Roman statesman, establishes a monastery at his estate in Italy. The Vivarium "monastery school" is for highly educated and sophisticated men, who copy sacred and secular manuscripts, intending for this to be their sole occupation (approximate date). 
 Pope Vigilius rejects Monophysitism in letters to Justinian I and patriarch Menas of Constantinople.  
 Benedict of Nursia writes his monastic rules, containing precepts for his monks (approximate date).

 World 
 Global environmental cooling occurs, due either to a comet impact or volcanic eruption in Central America, evidenced by global tree ring growth diminution.Baillie, M.G.L. (2007). Tree-Rings Indicate Global Environmental Downturns that could have been Caused by Comet Debris, Chap. 5 in Bobrowsky, Peter T. and Hans Rickman (eds.), Comet/Asteroid Impacts and Human Society: An Interdisciplinary Approach, Springer-Verlag, Berlin. , pp. 105–122. Recent evidence from Swiss ice core points to volcanic eruptions in Iceland. Historical evidence records this earlier as the Extreme weather events of 535–536.

Births 
 Authari, king of the Lombards (approximate date) 
 Columbanus, Irish missionary (or 543)
 Galswintha, Neustrian queen, married to Chilperic I (d. 568)
 Garibald I, duke of Bavaria (d. 591) 
 Pope Gregory I (the Great) (d. 604)
 John of Biclaro, Visigoth chronicler (approximate date)
 Myrddin Wyllt, Welsh legend (approximate date)

Deaths 
 Dignāga, Buddhist founder of Indian logic 
 Dionysius Exiguus (approximate date)
 Fridolin of Säckingen Irish missionary
 Vedast, Frankish bishop 
 Vitiges, king of the Ostrogoths
 Yifu, empress of Western Wei (b. 510)
 Yujiulü, empress of Western Wei (b. 525)

References